Office Hall is a historic plantation house located at King George Court House, King George County, Virginia. The remaining buildings are a two-story detached kitchen, built about 1805–1820, and a large, pyramidal-roofed smokehouse.  Also on the property is a non-contributing, commodious two-story frame farmhouse built about 1916–18, and a number of 20th century farm outbuildings.

It was listed on the National Register of Historic Places in 1991.

References

Farms on the National Register of Historic Places in Virginia
Plantation houses in Virginia
Buildings and structures in King George County, Virginia
National Register of Historic Places in King George County, Virginia
Houses in King George County, Virginia